Gunlā (Nepal Bhasa: गुंला) (also spelt Gumlā) is the tenth month in the Nepal Sambat lunar calendar, the national lunar calendar of Nepal. It corresponds to August of the Gregorian Calendar.

Gunla is a holy month for Newar Buddhists when they recite the scriptures, observe fasts and visit places of worship playing devotional music. It is one of the most important events in Newar Buddhism. The practice of observing the sacred month is descended from the rains retreat dating from the Buddha's time when monks are to stay in one place and taught the Dhamma to the locals during this period.

According to traditional beliefs, during primitive times, too much rain would fall. Due to this rain, the mud houses during the time would get devastated, moreover floods and landslides would add melancholy in people's lives. So, in order to downturn the melancholy, and be safe from floods and landslides, people would go to Swayambhu playing the devotional music as it was in an elevation.

Observances
Devotees mark the holy month by making daily early morning pilgrimages to Swayambhu in Kathmandu and other Buddhist temples playing Gunla Bajan music. The musical bands represent various localities of the city.

The devout recite the scriptures at home and sacred courtyards. Some undergo fasting. Another devotional activity during Gunla is Dyah Thāyegu (द्यः थायेगु) when devotees make little stupas out of black clay using a mold.

Major days

Panjarān

Panjaran (पन्जरां) is the alms giving festival. Males of the Bajracharya and Shakya castes make an alms round of the city and devotees give them rice and money. Shrines are set up with Buddha statues and paubha scroll paintings at private homes, courtyards and on the roadsides from where the gifts are distributed. The event is held on different dates in Kathmandu valley and Lalitpur.

Buddha display

On the first day of the second fortnight of Gunla, large images of the Dipankara Buddha and paubha paintings are put on display in sacred courtyards. The ceremony is known as Bahidyah Bwayegu (बहीद्यः ब्वयेगु).

On this day in a festival known as Bahidyah Swahwanegu (बहीद्यः स्वःवनेगु), the musical bands followed by residents of the locality visit the sacred courtyards in a procession to view the exhibits. The festival occurs on the day after the full moon and coincides with the Gai Jatra festival.

Another major day for Gunla Bajan societies is the ceremony of Nisala Chhawanegu (निसला छाःवनेगु) when they make offerings to Swayambhu, and hold Gunla Bajan concerts at one's neighborhoods.

Baghi 
Also on the first day of Gunla in Lalitpur, the sacred early morning rally "Baghi" begins usually from 1:30 in the morning for four days. The four stupas surrounding Lalitpur namely Lagankhya Thur in Lagankhel, Pucha Thur in Pulchowk, Bagmati Thur in Banglamukhi and Teta Thur in Gwarko are visited turn by turn in four days. The rally is accompanied by four types of musical bands namely Dha, Khin, Damokhin and Dhime Baja in a row. Each stupa is visited in a day thereby going to sub-stupas and temples visiting many Mahabihars and Bahals (chwoks or sacred courtyards). Devotees offer different types of offerings including chocolates, coins, camphor, etc while going around the walk. About 400 - 500 participants participate in this holy walk out of which some are the family and relatives of recent descendants.

Matayā

Matayā (मतया:) (meaning "light procession" in Nepal Bhasa) is one of the most important religious celebrations in Lalitpur visiting all the stupas visited in Baghi all in a day. The festival celebrates the event when the Buddha overcame Mara, or temptation, and attained the light of wisdom.

Devotees visit Buddhist shrines and sacred courtyards in the city in a winding file and offer worship to the images. The participants also consist of musical bands and actors dressed in colorful costumes. The circuitous festival route takes the whole day to complete.

Other celebrations

The 5th day of the bright fortnight is Nag Panchami, a day dedicated to serpents. The 1st day of the dark fortnight is Sāpāru or Gai Jātrā when processions are held in memory of family members deceased in the past year. The participants wear cow costumes and make a tour of the city.

The 8th day of the dark fortnight is the festival of Krishna Janmashtami which celebrates the birth of the Hindu deity Krishna. Gokarna Aunsi falls on the 15th day of the dark fortnight or Āmāi. This is Father's Day and is also known as Bauyā Khwā Swayegu ("Looking upon Father's Face").

Days in the month

Months of the year

See also

 Newar Buddhism
 Gunla Bajan
 Nepal Sambat
List of Buddhist festivals

References

Newar
Buddhist holidays
Buddhist festivals in Nepal
Months
Observances set by the Nepal Sambat calendar